The Truth Is is an Australian current affairs television program. It aired on Network Ten from 3 June to 17 June 2013, and was hosted by Hamish Macdonald. In the United States the program aired on Al Jazeera America.

Episodes
 Episode 1: After the Kill/Sunny Chernobyl
 Episode 2: Soldiers of Fortune
 Episode 3: Welcome to Prison/Russia's Paris Hilton?

References

2013 Australian television series debuts
2013 Australian television series endings
Al Jazeera America original programming
Australian television news shows
English-language television shows
Network 10 original programming